Bellarmine College Preparatory is an all-boys, Jesuit, private secondary school located in San Jose, California. Founded in 1851, it is the oldest secondary school in California and the second-oldest west of the Mississippi River. In 2020, Niche ranked Bellarmine as #1 in Best All-Boys High Schools in California.

Overview 

A Roman Catholic school in the tradition of Saint Ignatius of Loyola, Bellarmine is a member of the West Catholic Athletic League, the Jesuit Schools Network, and the Western Association of Schools and Colleges.

As of 2021, Bellarmine led the CIF Central Coast Section with 140 Division 1 titles. Bellarmine's Speech and Debate Team was ranked in the top 10 programs in the country with its policy debate team ranked #1 after winning the triple crown (NDCA Championship, Tournament of Champions (debate) and NDSA Nationals) in 2021. In addition, the school's FIRST Robotics Competition team, Team 254: The Cheesy Poofs, has been the World Champion (2011, 2014, 2017, 2018, 2021, 2022) for 4 of the past 10 years. The school's publications include its student newspaper, The Bell Online, and its yearbook, The Carillon.

The school is reputed for its graduates’ contributions and powerful influence in the Bay Area. Bellarmine's list of notable alumni includes 4 Olympians (six Gold Medals combined), 2 living Billionaires, 3 Mayors of San Jose, the former team owners of the San Francisco Giants and Oakland Athletics, 3 World Series Champions, 2 Super Bowl Champions, 1 Academy-Award Winner, 1 Pulitzer Prize Winner, 28 Professional MLB athletes, numerous award-winning authors and several state politicians. Previous Bellarmine alumni have won prestigious postgraduate scholarships including the Rhodes Scholarship, Marshall Scholarship, Schwarzman Scholarship, MacArthur Fellowship, and the Fulbright Awards.

History

Bellarmine was founded in 1851 by Fr. John Nobili, S.J., and his companions, as Santa Clara College, a school for secondary and college-age students. In 1912, the college was separated into 2 schools - Santa Clara University and Santa Clara Prep. After sharing the same campus for thirteen years, the secondary school moved to its current College Park Campus after purchasing the land from the University of Pacific (then known as the College of Pacific) for $77,500. 
In 1926 the renovated school opened its doors to a student body of 200 registered students.

After its relocation, several structural changes to the school's identity followed. In 1928, the school changed its name by the persuasion of the Archbishop of San Francisco to Bellarmine College Preparatory, in honor of Robert Cardinal Bellarmine, a canonized saint and Jesuit of the sixteenth century. 
The school colors converted from the red and white of Santa Clara to a blue and white pattern, to honor Saint Mary, the Mother of Jesus.

After World War II, Fr. Gerald Sugrue S.J. modernized the school's facilities by raising funds for the establishment of the Schott Academic Center, Vincent O’ Donnell Residence Hall, Samuel A. Liccardo Center, James A. Carney Science Center, Leontyne Chapel and Matthewson Hall. These new academic buildings accompanied the development of a new gymnasium and fitness center. Bellarmine remained a boarding school until 1985, after which the institution converted to a predominantly day school. In 2001, Bellarmine celebrated its 150th anniversary in educating young men in the Jesuit tradition.

In 2011, the Lorry I. Lokey Academic Center was completed after a $15 million gift from the family of the philanthropist and founder of Business Wire. This was the single largest gift in the school's history. The new center houses over 27 classrooms, a faculty lounge and the Craft-Malcolm Family Academic Resource Center.

The College Park Caltrain station is adjacent to the campus since its inception and has been a historic presence for Bellarmine's metropolitan community. Over 140 students take the train to school everyday from San Mateo county to Gilroy. The station is served by only 4 trains a day, timed to correspond with the school's hours. In recent years, amidst discussion of the station shutting down, the school has lobbied Caltrain to avoid cutting service to the station.

Academics 

As of 2020, Bellarmine's current enrollment size is approximately 1,655 students. 
The average class size is 22.5 and the student-to-teacher ratio is 13:1. For the Class of 2019, 99.2% of students went to attend college. 94.7% of graduating seniors were attending a four-year institution. Every year, a high amount of Bellarmine seniors matriculate into Jesuit universities including Santa Clara University, Loyola Marymount University, Gonzaga University, Boston College and Seattle University.

In 2020, the mean ACT score among Bellarmine students was 30.0 and the mean SAT score was 1346. In 2019, the school had 23 National Merit Semifinalists. Bellarmine administers an average of 1300 A.P tests each year with a pass rate of 84%.

Across its 10 academic departments, the school offers 19 AP courses and 11 Honors Courses to complement its curriculum designed to meet University of California (UC) and California State University (CSU) system requirements. For graduation, students are required to complete 42 credits spread out in a traditional liberal arts education with an emphasis on English, Mathematics and the Social Sciences. Every Bellarmine student is required to complete 6 semesters in Religious Studies and 2 semesters in Fitness and Health.

The school offers a number of fellowships including the Steve Pinkston Fellowship to recent college graduates and graduate students, of racially and culturally diverse descent who wish to serve at Bellarmine either through teaching, coaching, counseling or faith-based ministry.

Athletics

The Bellarmine Bells host 34 teams in 13 sports in the West Catholic Athletic League (WCAL) of the CIF Central Coast Section. The Bells fields teams from the freshman, junior varsity, and varsity level for the WCAL's (fall, winter, and spring) three seasons of league play. The schools also offers two sports (Ice hockey and Rugby) outside of WCAL play in the Sharks High School Ice Hockey League and the Skyhawk Conference respectively. Known for its athletics program, the school leads the CIF Central Coast Section (CCS) with 140 Team Titles and maintains several of the longest-winning streaks in section history.

Football 
The Bells Football team represents Bellarmine College Preparatory in the West Catholic Athletic League (WCAL) of the CIF Central Coast Section. The Bell's Football is currently headed by former San Jose State Spartan and Bellarmine alum Jalal Beauchman, the 6th head coach in the program's history. The 1965 John Hanna-coached Bells outscored opponents 310-6 during a 31-game winning streak to earn the first of two mythical state titles (the other was in 1981). After his team's victory in the NorCal CIF Division 1-AA 2015 Final, Coach Mike Janda became the all-time winningest football coach in CCS History. By his retirement, the coach led the Bells to an unprecedented 12 appearances at the CCS Finals. The program has produced 5 eventual Super Bowl champions.

Swimming 
Under Coach Larry Rogers, the Bellarmine Bells Swimming Team won 31 consecutive CCS titles (1984-2015) until a second-place finish to Gunn High School in 2016 snapped the school's monopoly on swimming.
The swim team title streak caught the eye of The San Francisco Chronicles Mitch Stevens who wrote, "That put [Bellarmine Coach Larry] Rogers...and the Bells...above such storied high school programs as Poway of San Diego wrestling, Mission Viejo swimming and yes, even De La Salle football."

Soccer 
The Bellarmine Soccer team is noted for the league's longest winning streak of 17 consecutive titles under Coach Patrick Lowney. 
The Bellarmine's 2002 varsity soccer team had a perfect 25-0-0 season. As of 2021, the soccer team coached by Conor Salcido '07 has won 3 of the past 5 CCS Open Division titles, a NorCal CIF Division 1 Title, and finished the 2021 season ranked #4 in the nation by Top Drawer Soccer and CBS Sports

Volleyball 
Bellarmine's volleyball team won nine of the thirteen CCS volleyball championships from 1997 to 2010, when coach Scott Petersen's team was ranked #5 in the country by ESPNRise and honored as having the highest grade point average in the state among boys volleyball teams. Former volleyball coach Patrick Adams remains the most successful volleyball coach in CCS history with 305 victories.

In the fall, the school offers Football, Cross country, Water polo. For winter, teams in Soccer, Wrestling, Basketball compete. Spring season witnesses the most sports with 7 sports: Tennis, Golf, Track and Field, Volleyball, Baseball, Swimming, Lacrosse

Co-Curricular Programs

Robotics
The Robotics Team is one of the larger organizations at Bellarmine with around 80 members. The team has won the World Chairman's Award (the highest award in FIRST), and the World Championships 5 times, the most of any FIRST team, in 2011, 2014, 2017, 2018, and 2022. The team also holds the record for most regional events won, having 40 regional wins to their name. In 2008, Bellarmine first entered VEX Robotics and in 2009–2010 won 16 regional competitions, 6 of them in international competition. In the 2010–2011 season, Bellarmine's VEX team 254A won the VEX World Excellence Award, the highest it confers. In 2014, the team won three regionals, the Curie Division, and World Championships. The school shares a partnership with NASA's Ames Research Center in Mountain View, California.

Student media & publications
In 2008 Bellarmine began its own radio station, KBCP The Bell, as a legal, unlicensed station at 1650 AM which reaches a 1-mile radius of the school. Programs include 30-minute newscasts, sports shows, daily music shows, and political talk radio. In August 2013 KBCP partnered with PlayON sports to produce bellarminetv.com, which then re-associated with High School Cube. In September 2013 KBCP added home Hockey games to its covered sports. KBCP also plays music during lunch break and offers student-run programs such as The Way Too Early Show, Hammertime, The Afternoon Grind and Cloud 140. KBCP peaked at 3700 listeners during its broadcast of the Bellarmine-Saint Francis football game in 2016.

The school is also host to a range of student publications. The student newspaper, The Bell Online, transformed into an online media source from the historic weekly-produced, The Cardinal in 2016 and publishes daily features, athletic stories and campus announcements. The yearbook, The Carillon is one of the state's oldest secondary school yearbooks and has won multiple national awards, including the National Student Press Association Pacemaker Awards and the Columbia Scholastic Press Association Crown Awards. In the past, other student publications included the Bellarmine Political Review and the Written Echo.

Speech and debate
With over 100 participants and 7 coaches, Bell's large speech and debate program has experienced success at the local and national levels. In 1994, Bellarmine won the team speech and debate National Forensic League Championship in Kansas City, Missouri. In 2003 and 2004 the team won the California State Championship, then came in second in the state in 2005 when it was ranked as one of the top two teams in the nation. In 2006, its policy debate team captured the National Championship. For nine years, 2006–2014, Bellarmine's Speech and Debate program won the California State Championship, as well as in 2022. The program trains students in 12 speech events and 6 debate categories. In 2021, Bellarmine won the Policy Debate Championship, 2nd place in Congressional Debate, Top 10 in International Extemp & National Extemp and received the Bruno E. Jacobs Award, which is given to the school who has the greatest number of cumulative rounds at the national tournament across the years. Its rival high school in speech and debate is Leland High School (San Jose, California).

In popular culture 
 Bellarmine's College Park Caltrain station is mentioned in Jack London's 1903 novel The Call of the Wild as the location at which the stolen canine protagonist is fenced, beginning his journey away from civilization.
 In his 1960 Lonesome Traveler collection, American poet Jack Kerouac writes about watching the Bells play football in "October in the Railroad Earth."

Notable alumni

 Marv Owen '24 - MLB (1931–1940)
 Nello Falaschi '31 - played for NFL's New York Giants
 John W. Gallivan '33 - publisher of The Salt Lake Tribune, 1960–1984
 Leo Righetti '44 - baseball player
 Conn Findlay '48 - holds four Olympic medals, three in rowing (1956 gold, 1960 bronze, 1964 gold) and one in sailing (1976 bronze)
 Wayne Belardi '48 - MLB first baseman 
 John Vasconcellos '50 - California State Senator
 Joe Albanese '51 - Major League Baseball (MLB) pitcher
 Jim Beall '70 - politician
 Dennis Crosby '52 - singer and actor
 Phillip Crosby '52 - singer and actor
 Jim Small '55 - MLB (1955–1958)
 Stephen Schott '57 - former owner of Oakland Athletics
 John A. Sobrato '57 real estate developer
 Billy Connors '59 - MLB pitcher and coach
 Ming Chin '60 - Associate Justice of the Supreme Court of California
 Frank Bergon '61 - writer
 Bob Gallagher '62 - MLB (1972–1975)
 Tom McEnery '63 - 61st Mayor of San Jose
 Dan Pastorini '67 - NFL quarterback (1971–1981, 1983), Super Bowl XV champion; played in 1975 Pro Bowl
 Jim Wilhelm '70 - MLB (1978–1979)
 Frank C. Girardot ‘79 - Author "Name Dropper: Investigating the Clark Rockefeller Mystery" 
 Nick Holt '81 - defensive coordinator of Purdue Boilermakers, former head coach of Idaho Vandals
 Sal Cesario '81 - NFL offensive guard
 Erik Howard '82 - played for NFL's New York Giants, New York Jets
 David Diaz-Infante '82 - played for NFL's San Diego Chargers, Denver Broncos, Philadelphia Eagles
 Randy Kirk '83 - NFL (1987–1999)
 Pablo Morales '83 - Olympic gold and silver medalist (1979–1983)
 Tony West '83 - 17th United States Associate Attorney General and current chief legal officer of Uber
 Jim Wahler '84 - played for NFL's Phoenix Cardinals, Washington Redskins
 Greg Gohr '85 - MLB (1993–1996)
 Ron Caragher '85 - NCAA football head coach
 Kelly Grovier '87 - poet and literary critic
 Ed Giovanola '87 - MLB (1995–1999)
 Sam Liccardo '87 - Mayor of San Jose (2015-)
 Stephen Mirrione '87 - Academy Award-winning film editor for Traffic
 Viet Thanh Nguyen '88 - 2016 Pulitzer Prize winner in fiction for his novel The Sympathizer 
 Ralph Alvarado '88 - Kentucky State Senator
 Joey Manahan '89 - Hawaii State Representative and Honolulu City Councilman
 John B. Owens '89 - United States Court of Appeals for the Ninth Circuit judge
 Nick Hatzke '91 - MLS player (2007–09), Houston Dynamo
 Gregg Hurwitz '91 - author
 Kevin McMahon '90: track & field athlete at 1996 and 2000 Olympics; teaches in Bellarmine's Visual and Performing Arts department
 Justin Baughman '92 - MLB second baseman
 Pat Burrell '94 - MLB outfielder
 Bassnectar (Lorin Ashton) '96: musician
 Helmy Eltoukhy '97 - co-founder & CEO of biotech startup companies Avantome and Guardant Health
 Kevin Frandsen '00 - MLB player, San Francisco Giants (2006-2015)
 Craig Bragg '00 - National Football League (NFL) wide receiver
 Copeland Bryan '01 - NFL defensive end
 Brian Armstrong '01 - Founder and CEO of Coinbase
  Matt Mahan '01 - 66th Mayor of San Jose 
 Sunkrish Bala '02 - actor
 Jose Moreno Brooks '03 - actor
 Francis Maka '03 - linebacker, San Jose SaberCats of Arena Football League
 Eric Thames '04: MLB player (2011–2012, 2017–2020)
 Alex Brightman '05 -  actor
 Scott Weltz '05 - U.S. Olympic Swimmer in 2012 Olympics (200 m Breaststroke)
 Tommy Medica '06 - MLB (2013–14)
 Mark Canha '07 - MLB first baseman 
 Erik Goeddel '07 - MLB pitcher, New York Mets (2014–present)
 Michael Clay '09 - Special teams Coordinator for the Philadelphia Eagles
 Mitchell Harrison White '13 - MLB pitcher for the Los Angeles Dodgers
 Marc Pelosi - MLS soccer player, San Jose Earthquakes (2015–2017)

References

External links

 

Boys' schools in California
Educational institutions established in 1851
Jesuit high schools in the United States
Catholic preparatory schools in California
Roman Catholic Diocese of San Jose in California
High schools in San Jose, California
1851 establishments in California
Catholic secondary schools in California
Former university-affiliated schools in the United States